"Ants Marching" is a song by American rock group Dave Matthews Band. It was released in September 1995 as the second single from their debut studio album Under the Table and Dreaming. It reached #18 on the Billboard Alternative chart and on the Mainstream Rock chart as well. The song was considered a successful hit single. A different recording of it was included on their prior album Remember Two Things. This version was significantly longer, clocking in at 6:08. According to DMBAlmanac.com, the song is one of Dave Matthews Band's best known songs. Dave Matthews wrote the music and lyrics prior to its first performance in 1991.

Track listings

U.S. CD single
"Ants Marching" (Album Version) – 4:31
"Ants Marching" (Live Version) – 4:45
"Ants Marching" (Live Acoustic Version) – 4:19

Australia CD single 1
"Ants Marching" (Album Version) – 4:31
"Ants Marching" (Live Version) – 4:45
"Ants Marching" (Live Acoustic Version) – 4:19
"All Along the Watchtower" – 7:04

Australia CD single 2
"Ants Marching" (Album Version) – 4:31
"What Would You Say" – 3:41
"Typical Situation" (Edit) – 3:57
"Ants Marching" (Live Version) – 4:45

Charts

Weekly charts

Covers 
The Piano Guys recorded a cover of the song as a mash-up with Beethoven's Ode to Joy, released on their album Wonders on 25 August 2014.

References

Dave Matthews Band songs
1995 singles
Songs written by Dave Matthews
Song recordings produced by Steve Lillywhite
Music videos directed by David Hogan
1994 songs